Jordan (JOR) competed at the 2001 Mediterranean Games in Tunis, Tunisia.

Athletics 

Three Jordanian athletes have achieved the minima of participation in the next Mediterranean Games (2 men. 1woman)

Men
Track & road events

Women
Track & road events

Boxing

Weightlifting 

Men

Karate 

Men

References

Nations at the 2001 Mediterranean Games